Peter Hutton may refer to:

 Peter Hutton (filmmaker) (1944–2016), experimental filmmaker
 Peter Hutton (priest) (1811–1880), English Roman Catholic priest and headmaster
 Peter Hutton (footballer) (born 1973), Irish football coach and former player
 Peter Hutton (media executive) (born 1966), English sports media executive and former commentator
 Peter Hutton (anaesthetist), president of the Royal College of Anaesthetists